Hero FinCorp, an associate company of Hero MotoCorp, is an Indian Non-banking financial company (NBFC). The company is currently engaged in consumer finance businesses and commercial lending. Consumer Finance includes financing Hero MotoCorp Two Wheeler, Loyalty Customer Loans (top up loans for existing customers) and providing Loans against property. On the commercial lending side it provides Indian corporates with a wide portfolio of financing products which include working capital loans, machine loans among others. It is a captive finance company of Hero MotoCorp Ltd.

Journey 
The company was launched in 1992 as Hero Honda Finlease Ltd by extending working capital loans and medium-term finance to component suppliers and dealers of parent firm Hero MotoCorp, then called Hero Honda Motors Ltd.

In 2011, as Hero Honda Motors was restructured, the company was renamed Hero FinCorp and acquired its present form. By April 2013, the company began giving two-wheelers loans to customers. In 2014, it ventured into loans against property, loans for small and medium enterprises and commercial loans.

Products / Services

Two Wheeler Loans 
Hero FinCorp provides financing for purchase of Hero MotoCorp two wheelers. The firm claims to have over 350,000 active two-wheeler customer loans in June 2015. It plans to be present in over 730 Hero MotoCorp dealerships by end of March 2016.

Loyalty Customer Personal Loans 
Hero FinCorp provides financing options for its existing customers who have availed loans to purchase two-wheelers from Hero MotoCorp. Customers with good track record of repayment are offered a Top-up Loan, called Loyalty Personal Loan (LPL). Fulfillment through the diverse dealership network of Hero MotoCorp combined with a wide front office network of CAMS is enabled.

Used Car Finance 
The company has recently started financing of used cars for both salaried and self-employed individuals. The company offers customizable tenures and payment options.

 Leading auto portal, CarDekho.com has partnered with Hero FinCorp, a leading non-banking financial company, to bring comprehensive financing options to its used car buyers

Loan Against Property 
The company provides loans against property to corporates, partnership firms and self-employed individuals for up to 15 years with customizable interest rates.

SME & Commercial Loans 
 Bill Discounting
 Working Capital Term Loan 
 Working Capital Demand Loan
 Term Loan
 Project Finance
 Acquisition Financing
 Machine Term Loan
 Medical Equipment Financing
 E-commerce Dealer Financing
 Hero MotoCorp Dealer Financing

SimplyCash - Instant Loan App 
In early 2020, the company has launched SimplyCash and enter the instant cash loan segment. Millennials across 90 cities in India can download the app and avail instant cash loan as per their need.

Quality Certification - ISO 9001 : 2015 
On April 18, 2017, Hero FinCorp was awarded ISO 9001 : 2015 Certificate for implementing and maintaining a Quality Management System in Corporate and Retail Operations for Financial Activities and Related Customer Support.

Company Performance 
Hero FinCorp recorded a turnover of Rs.298.62 crore in 2014–15.

The company has been rated as AA+ / stable by rating agencies such as CRISIL and ICRA.

External Funds Raised:

In September 2016, Hero FinCorp announced that they have raised about INR 1002 crore from internal as well as external sources.

Around INR 702 was raised from ChrysCapital, a private equity firm, and Credit Suisse, a Swiss financial services firm. The remaining INR 300 Crore, was raised from the Hero Group.

ChrysCapital will take an 11% stake in Hero FinCorp while Credit Suisse will hold around 2.5%. This transaction had valued the company around INR 5,200 crore.

The funds will be deployed to help the company achieve its growth strategy over the next 12 to 18 months. The strategy entails entering new product segments, such as home loans and used two-wheeler loans and by further augmenting existing businesses, with special focus on used car finance, consumer durable and SME lending.

Growth Plans 
Hero FinCorp has achieved Rs.6,400 crore loan book by March 16.

See also 
 Hero MotoCorp

References

External links 
 Hero FinCorp  at Reuters
 Hero FinCorp at Bloomberg
 News on Hero FinCorp at Mint

Financial services companies of India
Financial services companies established in 1991
1991 establishments in Delhi
Companies based in Delhi
Hero Group
Indian companies established in 1991